The  are wetlands in the center of Ikema Island, Miyahojima, Okinawa, Japan. It is also called Yunimui or Īnubū in the local dialect. It was designated a Wildlife Protection Area on November 1, 2011.

History
The island of Ikema-jima was formerly divided into an eastern and a western island, with a water lane between. The  king of the four islands built a bridge between the two. Eventually, the two islands were connected. For the purposes of land reclamation, the water lane was interrupted between 1924 and 1934. The wetland area outside the dike, combining both freshwater and seawater, was called Yunimui ("sand elevated area"). Between 1963 and 1982, Ikema Fishing Port was built and the wetland area was completely separated from the sea.

Observation Platform
A wooden observation platform was replaced in 2009 with a steel platform. A road and parking lots were constructed.

A problem in the 21st century is that the wetland is shrinking with the growth of weeds.

Biota

Fauna

Birds
The wetland is visited by Eurasian wigeon, mallard, eastern spot-billed duck, northern shoveler, garganey, Eurasian coot, and Eurasian bittern.  Purple heron and bean goose are rare visitors.

Fish and crustacean

Tilapia and guppy of foreign origin are found. Discoplax or  cross the road for reproduction every June. Coconut crabs are also found.

Insects
Ceriagrion latericium ryukyuuanum, Cercion sexlineatum, Ictingomphus pertinax, Brachydiplax chalybea flavovittat, Tholymis tillarga are found. Other insects include Gerridae and Hydrophilidae.

Flora
In 1983 the previous wetland was found to have become partly grassland with Panicum repens L. and Miscanthus sinensis. In the wetland were Panicum paludosum Roxb., Cyperus tenuispica Streud, Cyoerus pillosus Vahl, Cyperus difformis, Eleocharis geniculata, Fimbristylis miliacea and Aeschynomene indica. As a reminder of the Bay vegetation was Exoecaria agallocha L. as of 1978. At the frontline of water surface was Typha domingensis, toward the shore were Scirpus tabemaemontanic Gmelin, Paspalum vaginatum Schwarz and Cladium chinense Nees; they were seen in line.  At the periphery of the Ikema Island were trees of Pandanus tectorius, while in the eastern muddy area was Clerodendrum inerme.

See also
 Ramsar Sites in Japan

References
Kei Higa, Okinawa Encyclopedia jou 1983, Okinawa Times.

External links
Photographs of Ikema Wetland

Footnotes

Miyakojima, Okinawa
Protected areas of Japan
 
Environment of Japan